Atrichozancla is a genus of moths in the lecithocerid subfamily Lecithocerinae. It was established by Anthonie Johannes Theodorus Janse in 1954.

Species
 Atrichozancla cosymbota (Meyrick, 1920)
 Atrichozancla gymnopalpa Janse, 1963
 Atrichozancla phaeocrossis (Meyrick, 1937)

References

Natural History Museum Lepidoptera genus database

 
Lecithocerinae
Moth genera